The 2022 NCAA National Collegiate Women's Water Polo Championship was the 20th edition of the NCAA Women's Water Polo Championship, the annual tournament to decide the championship of NCAA women's collegiate water polo. The tournament was held May 4–8, 2022, at the Canham Natatorium in Ann Arbor, Michigan. Stanford defeated USC 10–7 for the program's eighth national title.

Qualifying teams
The field of teams was revealed in a selection show on April 25, 2022. Six conferences were granted automatic qualification to the championship: the Big West Conference, Collegiate Water Polo Association, Golden Coast Conference, Metro Atlantic Athletic Conference, Mountain Pacific Sports Federation, and Western Water Polo Association. Three additional teams earned entry into the tournament with at-large bids, with all of them coming from the Mountain Pacific Sports Federation.

Schedule and results
All times Eastern.

Tournament bracket

All Tournament Team
 Makenzie Fischer, Stanford (Most Outstanding Player)
 Paige Hauschild, USC
 Tilly Kearns, USC

References

NCAA Women's Water Polo Championship
NCAA Women's Water Polo Championship
NCAA Women's Water Polo Championship
NCAA Women's Water Polo